= ASME QME-1 =

ASME QME-1 is a standard maintained by the American Society of Mechanical Engineers that provides the requirements and guidelines for the qualification of active mechanical equipment (QME) whose function is required to ensure the safe operation or safe shutdown of a nuclear facility.

== Organization of QME-1 ==
The 2017 edition of QME-1 is organized by the following major sections:

- Section QR: General Requirements
- Section QDR: Qualification of Dynamic Restraints
- Section QP: Qualification of Active Pump Assemblies
- Section QV: Qualification Requirements for Active Valve Assemblies for Nuclear Facilities

== Standards Committee on Qualification of Mechanical Equipment Used in Nuclear Facilities (QME) ==
ASME QME-1 is maintained and revised by QME and its associated sub-tier groups using the ASME standards development process. Work activities are delegated to specific subcommittees, as per their established charters.

- QME Subcommittee on General Requirements
- QME Subcommittee on Qualification of Active Dynamic Restraints
- QME Subcommittee on Qualification of Pump Assemblies
- QME Subcommittee on Qualification of Valve Assemblies
